Abakaliki is a Local Government Area of Ebonyi State, Nigeria. It's headquarters are in the town of Nkaliki.

It has an area of 443 km and a population of 126,837

based on the census conducted i2006. Thehe postal code of the area is 480. The  towns, Villages and urban area zip codes can be found in Ebonyi state postal code and Abakaliki Zip code.

References

Local Government Areas in Ebonyi State